Scarlatti is a pit-floored crater on Mercury, which was discovered in 1974 by the Mariner 10 spacecraft. It has a prominent peak ring, and it is one of 110 peak ring basins on Mercury. The crater floor is covered by the smooth plains material. The crater displays an arcuate collapse feature (central pit) along the northeastern peak ring. Such a feature may have resulted from collapse of a magma chamber underlying the central peak ring complex of the crater. The collapse feature is an analog of Earth's volcanic calderas. Scarlatti is thought to have the same age as the Caloris basin.

Hollows
A cluster of hollows are present along the southwestern peak ring.

References

Impact craters on Mercury